Fred M. Butler (May 28, 1854 – December 24, 1932) was a Vermont attorney and judge.  He is notable for his service as an associate justice of the Vermont Supreme Court from 1923 to 1926.

Early life
Fred Mason Butler was born in Jamaica, Vermont on May 28, 1854, the son of Aaron Mason Butler (1815-1886) and Emeline (Muzzy) Butler (d. 1877).  He was educated in the public schools of Jamaica, and graduated from Leland and Gray Seminary in Townshend.
 
Butler had started his legal studies in the Jamaica office of Jonathan G. Eddy while still at Leland & Gray.  After graduation, he continued studying law under his uncle in the same Jamaica office that included  Hoyt Henry Wheeler and Eleazer L. Waterman.  He was admitted to the bar in 1877, after which he moved to Rutland.

Start of career
Butler established a law practice in Rutland, first in partnership with Joel C. Baker, then with Lyman W. Redington, and finally with Thomas W. Moloney.  From 1906 to 1907, Butler was president of the Vermont Bar Association, and he was succeeded by Alexander Dunnett.  He was also involved in several businesses; he was a member of the board of directors of the Baxter National Bank and Rutland Railway Light & Power Company, and was an original incorporator of the State Mutual Fire Insurance Company.

Active in politics and government as a Republican, Butler served as a delegate to numerous city, county, and state party conventions.  He also served in local office including grand juror (1882–84), city attorney (1884-89), and judge of the Rutland city court (1889–95).  In 1908 he was elected to the Vermont Senate.

Butler was an active leader of the Baptist church.  He was a member of First Baptist Church in Rutland, and served as president of the state Baptist convention from 1909 to 1910.

Judicial career
In 1908, the Vermont General Assembly enacted a law expanding the Vermont Supreme Court from four justices to five.  The appointment as an associate justice went to George M. Powers, who was serving as a judge of the Vermont Superior Court, and had been an associate justice prior to the passage of a previous law reducing the size of the state Supreme Court.  Butler was selected for the resulting vacancy on the Vermont Superior Court, and resigned from the State Senate in January 1909 in order to accept.  He continued to serve on this court until 1923.  From 1921 to 1923, Butler served as chief judge, having succeeded Zed S. Stanton.

In 1923, associate justice Willard W. Miles retired from the state Supreme Court.  Butler was appointed to fill the vacancy, and he served until 1926, when he retired.  He was succeeded by Sherman R. Moulton.

Retirement and death
Butler died in Rutland on December 24, 1932.  He was buried at Evergreen Cemetery in Rutland.

Family
In 1875, Butler married Lillian Harriet Holton (1852-1935), a resident of Bangor, New York.  They were the parents of three daughters: Anza Lillian (1876-1933) was the wife of Wallace W. Nichols of Rutland; Helen Maria (1885-1981), the wife of John A. Barney of Rutland; and Florence Muzzy (1892-1973), the wife of Leon E. Ellsworth of Enosburg Falls and Roy S. Woodward of Waterville.  A son was born in 1879 and died in 1880.  Another son, Aaron Mason Butler, was born and died in 1891.

Butler's siblings included Edgar M. Butler (1857-1928), who served as a member of the Vermont Senate.

References

Sources

Newspapers

Books

Internet

1854 births
1932 deaths
People from Jamaica, Vermont
People from Rutland (city), Vermont
Vermont lawyers
Republican Party Vermont state senators
U.S. state supreme court judges admitted to the practice of law by reading law
Justices of the Vermont Supreme Court
Burials at Evergreen Cemetery (Rutland, Vermont)